Dragon Lord, also known as Dragon's Breath, 1990 computer game for the Amiga, Atari ST and MS-DOS published by Palace Software and Spotlight Software. A fantasy-themed strategy game, players control one of three dragon lords competing to find the (game-winning) talisman. This goal is achieved by raising dragons, empowering them via alchemy, and then sending them to conquer towns.

Reception
Computer Gaming World stated that "many will find game play painfully slow", but deserved some praise for its novel subject and "innovative game play". The magazine concluded that Dragon Lord would appeal to strategy gamers rather than to adventurers.

References

External links

Amiga Magazine official review of Dragon Lord
Dragon's Breath at Lemon Amiga

1990 video games
Amiga games
Atari ST games
DOS games
Fantasy video games
Single-player video games
Strategy video games
Video games about dragons
Video games developed in the United Kingdom
Palace Software games